California Spring is an 1875 oil landscape painting by the Hudson River School artist Albert Bierstadt.

References

Paintings by Albert Bierstadt
Paintings in the collection of the Fine Arts Museums of San Francisco
1875 paintings